Alfa was the designation of an Italian ballistic missile program that started in 1971 under the control of the GRS (Gruppo di Realizzazione Speciale Interforze). It was related to the Polaris A-3 missile.

Development 
Born from the development effort for efficient solid-propellant rocket engines, the Alfa was planned as a two-stage missile. Test launches with an upper stage mockup took place between 1973 and 1975, from Salto di Quirra.

It supplied a thrust of 232 kN for a duration of 57 seconds. It could carry a one tonne warhead for a range of 1,600 kilometres (990 mi), placing European Russia and Moscow in range of the Adriatic Sea.

Italy has been active in the space sector since 1957, conducting launch and control operations from the Luigi Broglio Space Centre. The advanced Scout and Vega launchers currently used by the European Space Agency (ESA) derive their technological basis partially from Alfa studies.

See also
 Italian nuclear weapons program

References

Medium-range ballistic missiles